Bryntirion may refer to:
Bryntirion, a locality within Bridgend, Wales
Bryntirion (Brisbane), Australia, a heritage-listed house
The Bryntirion Estate, Pretoria, South Africa